= Board game development =

Process of making a board game

Board game development is the process of creating, designing, and producing a board game. It includes concept creation, game design, product development, funding, marketing, and promotion. The process of board game design bears certain similarities to software design.

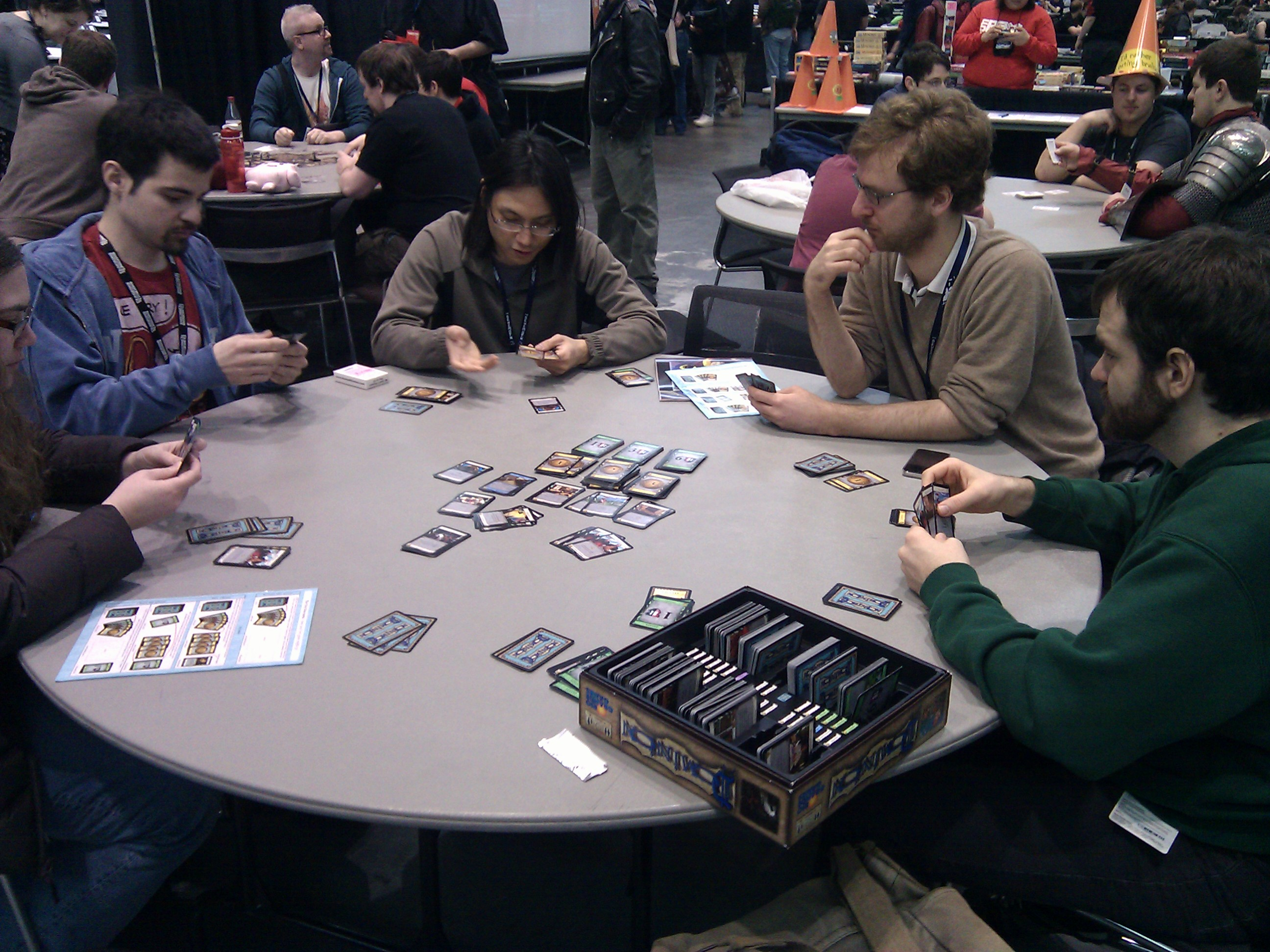
Dominion at pax east 2011
